Chappaz is a surname. Notable people with the surname include:

Marie-Thérèse Chappaz (born 1960), Swiss wine maker
Maurice Chappaz (1916–2009), Swiss-French writer and poet